Saint Cassius may refer to: 

Cassius of Clermont, martyr, 3rd century.  Martyred with Victorinus, Maximus, Anatolius, Linguinus, and others
Cassius of Narni, bishop of Narni, 6th century
Saint Cassius, companion of Saint Gereon
Saint Cassius, companion of Saint Castus
Saint Cassius (musician) American musician
See Carpophorus, Exanthus, Cassius, Severinus, Secundus, and Licinius for Saint Cassius